Oberea affinis is a species of longhorn beetle in the tribe Saperdini in the genus Oberea, discovered by Leng & Hamilton in 1896.

References

A
Beetles described in 1896